The Grand Prix of Moscow was a one-day road cycling race held annually in Moscow, Russia between 2004 and 2015. From 2005 to 2015, it was held as part of the UCI Europe Tour as a 1.2 category race. The most successful rider was Alexander Khatuntsev, who has two victories.

Past winners

External links

UCI Europe Tour races
Recurring sporting events established in 2004
Recurring sporting events disestablished in 2015
Cycle races in Russia
2004 establishments in Russia
2015 disestablishments in Russia
Sports competitions in Moscow
Annual sporting events in Russia
Annual events in Moscow
Spring (season) events in Russia